The 1999 Rutgers Scarlet Knights football team represented Rutgers University in the 1999 NCAA Division I-A football season. The Scarlet Knights were led by fourth-year head coach Terry Shea and played their home games at Rutgers Stadium. They were a member of the Big East Conference. They finished the season 1–10, 1–6 in Big East play.

Schedule

References

Rutgers
Rutgers Scarlet Knights football seasons
Rutgers Scarlet Knights football